
Mount Lucania in Yukon is the third-highest mountain in Canada (5240 metres), and the second-highest mountain located entirely within the country (the summit of Mount Saint Elias, Canada's second highest peak, is shared with the US state of Alaska). A long ridge connects Mount Lucania with Mount Steele, the fifth-highest in Canada. Lucania was named by the Duke of Abruzzi, as he stood on the summit of Mount Saint Elias on July 31, 1897, having just completed the first ascent.  Seeing Lucania in the far distance, beyond Mount Logan, he immediately named it "after the ship on which the expedition had sailed from Liverpool to New York," the RMS Lucania.

Climbing History 
First Ascent
The first ascent of Mount Lucania was made in 1937 by Bradford Washburn and Robert Hicks Bates. Washburn called upon Bob Reeve, a famous Alaskan bush pilot, who later replied by cable to Washburn, "Anywhere you'll ride, I'll fly". The ski-equipped Fairchild F-51 made several trips to the landing site on the glacier without event in May, but on landing with Washburn and Bates in June, the plane sank into unseasonal slush. Washburn, Bates and Reeve pressed hard for five days to get the airplane out and Reeve was eventually able to get the airplane airborne with all excess weight removed and with the assistance of a smooth icefall with a steep drop. Washburn and Bates continued on foot to make the first ascent of Lucania, and in an epic descent and journey to civilization, they hiked over  through the wilderness to safety in the small town of Burwash Landing in the Yukon.

Washburn's party was forced to abandon a great deal of gear—more than 1,000 pounds of cameras, surveying equipment and other supplies—on Walsh Glacier. In 2022, an expedition led by U.S. professional skier Griffin Post located Washburn's lost equipment, which had been carried 14 miles from its original location by the glacier. Assisted by officials from Canada’s National Parks service and a team of archaeologists, much of the gear was collected and cleaned.

Subsequent Notable Ascents
The second ascent of Lucania was made in 1967 by Jerry Halpern, Mike Humphreys, Gary Lukis, and Gerry Roach.

In April-May 2021, Pascale Marceau and Eva Capozzola summited the peak, the first all-woman team of climbers to do so.

See also
 List of mountain peaks of Canada

References

Literature
David Roberts, Escape from Lucania: An Epic Story of Survival  (2002), Simon & Schuster, .

External links

Five-thousanders of Yukon
Saint Elias Mountains